Rakos may refer to:

People
 Daniel Rákos (born 1987), Czech ice hockey player

Places
Rákoš, Košice-okolie District, Slovakia
Rákoš, Revúca District, Slovakia

Other uses
 4108 Rakos, a minor planet

See also